Neocollyris subtilobscurata is a species of ground beetle in the genus Neocollyris in the family Carabidae. It was described by Horn in 1925.

References

Subtilobscurata, Neocollyris
Beetles described in 1925